In biology, mating is the pairing of either opposite-sex or hermaphroditic organisms for the purposes of sexual reproduction. Fertilization is the fusion of two gametes.  Copulation is the union of the sex organs of two sexually reproducing animals for insemination and subsequent internal fertilization. Mating may also lead to external fertilization, as seen in amphibians, fishes and plants. For most species, mating is between two individuals of opposite sexes. However, for some hermaphroditic species, copulation is not required because the parent organism is capable of self-fertilization (autogamy); for example, banana slugs.

The term mating is also applied to related processes in bacteria, archaea and viruses.  Mating in these cases involves the pairing of individuals, accompanied by the pairing of their homologous chromosomes and then exchange of genomic information leading to formation of recombinant progeny (see mating systems).

Animals

For animals, mating strategies include random mating, disassortative mating, assortative mating, or a mating pool. In some birds, it includes behaviors such as nest-building and feeding offspring. The human practice of mating and artificially inseminating domesticated animals is part of animal husbandry.

In some terrestrial arthropods, including insects representing basal (primitive) phylogenetic clades, the male deposits spermatozoa on the substrate, sometimes stored within a special structure.  Courtship involves inducing the female to take up the sperm package into her genital opening without actual copulation. Courtship is often facilitated through forming groups, called leks, in flies and many other insects. For example, male Tokunagayusurika akamusi forms swarms dancing in the air to attract females. In groups such as dragonflies and many spiders, males extrude sperm into secondary copulatory structures removed from their genital opening, which are then used to inseminate the female (in dragonflies, it is a set of modified sternites on the second abdominal segment; in spiders, it is the male pedipalps). In advanced groups of insects, the male uses its aedeagus, a structure formed from the terminal segments of the abdomen, to deposit sperm directly (though sometimes in a capsule called a "spermatophore") into the female's reproductive tract.

Other animals reproduce sexually with external fertilization, including many basal vertebrates. Vertebrates (such as reptiles, some fish, and most birds) reproduce with internal fertilization through cloacal copulation (see also hemipenis), while mammals copulate vaginally.

In domesticated animals there are various type of mating methods being employed to mate animals like Pen Mating (when female is moved to the desired male into a pen) or paddock mating (where one male is let loose in the paddock with several females).

Plants and fungi

Like in animals, mating in other Eukaryotes, such as plants and fungi, denotes . However, in vascular plants this is mostly achieved without physical contact between mating individuals (see pollination), and in some cases, e.g., in fungi no distinguishable male or female organs exist (see isogamy); however, mating types in some fungal species are somewhat analogous to sexual dimorphism in animals, and determine whether or not two individual isolates can mate. Yeasts are eukaryotic microorganisms classified in the kingdom Fungi, with 1,500 species currently described. In general, under high stress conditions like nutrient starvation, haploid cells will die; under the same conditions, however, diploid cells of Saccharomyces cerevisiae can undergo sporulation, entering sexual reproduction (meiosis) and produce a variety of haploid spores, which can go on to mate (conjugate) and reform the diploid.

Protists

Protists are a large group of diverse eukaryotic microorganisms, mainly unicellular animals and plants, that do not form tissues.  Eukaryotes emerged in evolution more than 1.5 billion years ago.  The earliest eukaryotes were likely protists. Mating and sexual reproduction are widespread among extant eukaryotes including protists such as Paramecium and Chlamydomonas. In many eukaryotic species, mating is promoted by sex pheromones including the protist Blepharisma japonicum. Based on a phylogenetic analysis, Dacks and Roger proposed that facultative sex was present in the common ancestor of all eukaryotes.

However, to many biologists it seemed unlikely until recently, that mating and sex could be a primordial and fundamental characteristic of eukaryotes.  A principal reason for this view was that mating and sex appeared to be lacking in certain pathogenic protists whose ancestors branched off early from the eukaryotic family tree.  However, several of these protists are now known to be capable of, or to recently have had, the capability for meiosis and hence mating.  To cite one example, the common intestinal parasite Giardia intestinalis was once considered to be a descendant of a protist lineage that predated the emergence of meiosis and sex.  However, G. intestinalis was recently found to have a core set of genes that function in meiosis and that are widely present among sexual eukaryotes.  These results suggested that G. intestinalis is capable of meiosis and thus mating and sexual reproduction.  Furthermore, direct evidence for meiotic recombination, indicative of mating and sexual reproduction, was also found in G. intestinalis.  Other protists for which evidence of mating and sexual reproduction has recently been described are parasitic protozoa of the genus Leishmania, Trichomonas vaginalis, and acanthamoeba.

Protists generally reproduce asexually under favorable environmental conditions, but tend to reproduce sexually under stressful conditions, such as starvation or heat shock.

See also 

Heterosexuality
Animal husbandry
 Breeding in the wild
 Breeding season
 Evolution of sex
 Lordosis behavior
 Mate choice copying
 Mating system
 Reproduction
 Sex determination system
 Sexual conflict
 Sexual intercourse

References

External links 

 Introduction to Animal Reproduction
 Advantages of Sexual Reproduction

 
Animal developmental biology
Reproduction in animals
Sexology
Sexuality
Ethology
Fertility